Kabirpur may refer to:
Kabirpur, Kapurthala, Punjab
Kabirpur, Gopalganj, Bihar
Kabirpur, Lucknow